The Eternal Summer is a Big Finish Productions audio drama based on the long-running science fiction television series Doctor Who

Plot 
Present day, Stockbridge, there is something strange going on in here, it seems that the summer never ends in Stockbridge, and no one wants it to end......

Cast 
 The Doctor — Peter Davison
 Nyssa — Sarah Sutton
 Maxwell Edison — Mark Williams
 Lizzie Corrigan— Pam Ferris
 Harold Withers — Roger Hammond
 Alice Withers — Susan Brown
 Dudley Jackson — Nick Brimble
 Jane Potter — Abigail Hollick
 Vicar — Barnaby Edwards
 Geoff — Nicholas Briggs

Continuity 
This story takes place after Castle of Fear.

External links 
 The Eternal Summer on Big Finish Productions
 The Eternal Summer on Doctor Who Reference Guide

2009 audio plays
Fifth Doctor audio plays
Fiction set in 1950
Fiction set in 1984
Fiction set in 1990
Fiction set in 2009